Confessional Lutheranism is a name used by Lutherans to designate those who believe in the doctrines taught in the Book of Concord of 1580 (the Lutheran confessional documents) in their entirety. Confessional Lutherans maintain that faithfulness to the Book of Concord, which is a summary of the teachings found in Scripture, requires attention to how that faith is actually being preached, taught, and put into practice. Confessional Lutherans believe that this is a vital part of their identity as Lutherans.

The term Confessional Lutheran is generally used among the more conservative churches found in groupings such as the International Lutheran Council (ILC), the Confessional Evangelical Lutheran Conference (CELC), and the Global Confessional and Missional Lutheran Forum. Churches of the larger Lutheran World Federation subscribe to the Book of Concord as an exposition of faith in so far as (quatenus) it agrees with their interpretation of the Bible.

History
Two main confessional movements arose during the 19th century: the Old Lutherans and the Neo-Lutherans. The Old Lutherans originated from the Schism of the Old Lutherans, while Neo-Lutheranism arose in Germany in the 1830s from the Pietist driven Erweckung, or Awakening. Neo-Lutheranism itself contained differing camps. It gave rise later to those calling themselves confessional Lutherans.

Neo-Lutheranism developed in reaction to Pietism on the one side and Rationalism on the other, both of which had arisen in the previous century. German clergymen such as Martin Stephan, C. F. W. Walther, F. C. D. Wyneken, and Wilhelm Loehe became a part of the movement as they studied the works of Martin Luther and the Book of Concord.

The Old Lutheran and Neo-Lutheran movements spread to the United States with the Neo-Lutheran Loehe and the Old Lutheran free church leader Friedrich August Brünn, both sending missionaries to newly arrived German immigrants in the Midwest, and with the immigration of groups including the Saxons who settled in Missouri under Martin Stephan and C. F. W. Walther, the Germans who settled in Indiana under F. C .D. Wyneken, and the Prussians under J. A. A. Grabau in Western New York and southeastern Wisconsin (the Buffalo Synod).

In Scandinavia, where High Church Lutheranism and Pietist Lutheranism has been highly influential, the Evangelical Lutheran Mission Diocese of Finland, Mission Province of the Church of Sweden, and the Evangelical Lutheran Diocese of Norway entered into schism with their national churches due to "the secularization of the national/state churches in their respective countries involving matters of both Christian doctrine and ethics"; these are members of the International Lutheran Council with their bishops having secured their lines of apostolic succession from other traditional Lutheran Churches, such as the Evangelical Lutheran Church in Kenya.

Church bodies using the title "confessional"
Contemporary Lutheran church bodies that identify themselves as confessional tend to be either members of the International Lutheran Council, the Confessional Evangelical Lutheran Conference, the Global Confessional and Missional Lutheran Forum, or certain other independent Lutheran bodies. Among the members of the ILC are the Lutheran Church–Missouri Synod, the Lutheran Church–Canada, the Independent Evangelical-Lutheran Church of Germany, and the Lutheran Church of Australia. Among the CELC are the Wisconsin Evangelical Lutheran Synod and the Evangelical Lutheran Synod. Other confessional Lutherans include the Church of the Lutheran Confession, the American Association of Lutheran Churches, the Concordia Lutheran Conference, the Evangelical Lutheran Diocese of North America, member congregations of the Protes'tant Conference, and member congregations of the Orthodox Lutheran Confessional Conference of Independent Congregations, the United Lutheran Mission Association, and the Evangelical Lutheran Conference & Ministerium of North America (all of North America).

In the Nordic countries, members of the Communion of Nordic Lutheran Dioceses are a part of the International Lutheran Council: these include the Evangelical Lutheran Mission Diocese of Finland, the Mission Province of the Church of Sweden, and the Evangelical Lutheran Diocese of Norway. These dioceses entered into schism with the Evangelical Lutheran Church of Finland, Church of Sweden, and Church of Norway, respectively, due to "the secularization of the national/state churches in their respective countries involving matters of both Christian doctrine and ethics". Apostolic succession of the Mission Province is derived from Walter Obare Omwanza, the presiding bishop of the Evangelical Lutheran Church in Kenya, who, assisted by bishops Leonid Zviki from Belarus, David Tswaedi from South Africa, and Børre Knudsen and Ulf Asp from Norway, consecrated Arne Olsson as bishop of the diocese. The Concordia Lutheran Church and the Evangelical Lutheran Church in Sweden are other bodies that identify as Confessional Lutherans in the region of Scandinavia. 

Additionally, the Association of Free Lutheran Congregations (AFLC) describes themselves as confessional. The autonomous congregations within the AFLC are only required to officially subscribe to the unaltered Augsburg Confession and Luther's Small Catechism, but many member congregations officially subscribe to more, or all, of the Book of Concord, while others do so unofficially in matters of doctrine and practice. All internally trained AFLC pastors are taught a quia subscription of the Book of Concord, leaving the denomination as a whole "unofficially" confessional in matters of preaching and teaching.

Though there are some congregations in the Evangelical Lutheran Church in America which would call themselves "confessional", many of those congregations have decided to leave the ELCA due to the liberal leanings of the denomination, most notably their stances expressed in the 2009 ELCA convention.  The ELCA as a whole does not use the title "confessional" to describe itself, but it and the other member churches of the Lutheran World Federation do ascribe to the unaltered Augsburg Confession and the other confessional documents in the Book of Concord as true interpretations of the Christian faith.

"Quia" versus "Quatenus" subscription
Lutheran church bodies and Lutheran individuals that identify themselves as confessional hold to a "quia" (Latin for "because")  rather than a "quatenus" (Latin for "insofar as") subscription to the Book of Concord, which contains the Apostles' Creed, Nicene Creed, Athanasian Creed, Luther's Small Catechism, Luther's Large Catechism, the Augsburg Confession, the Apology of the Augsburg Confession, the Smalcald Articles, the Treatise on the Power and Primacy of the Pope, and the Formula of Concord.

Quia subscription (the Book of Concord is adhered to because it is faithful to the Scriptures) implies that the subscriber believes that there is no contradiction between the Book of Concord and the Scriptures. Quatenus subscription (the Book of Concord is adhered to insofar as it is faithful to the Scriptures) implies that the subscriber leaves room for the possibility that there might be a contradiction of the Scriptures in the Book of Concord in which case the subscriber would hold to the Scriptures against the Book of Concord. Some Confessional Lutherans  maintain that this distinguishes them from other ("mainline") Lutheran bodies and Lutherans, who, they believe, hold to a quatenus subscription.

C. F. W. Walther explained the meaning of confessional subscription: An unconditional subscription is the solemn declaration which the individual who wants to serve the church makes under oath (1) that he accepts the doctrinal content of our Lutheran Confessions, because he recognizes the fact that they are in full agreement with Scripture and do not militate against Scripture in any point, whether the point be of major or minor importance; and (2) that he therefore heartily believes in this divine truth and is determined to preach this doctrine.

Views on the Antichrist
Confessional Lutherans, including the Lutheran Church–Missouri Synod, Wisconsin Evangelical Lutheran Synod, the Evangelical Lutheran Synod, and the Church of the Lutheran Confession officially maintain that the Early apostolic Church had been led into the Great Apostasy by the Roman Catholic Church and that the Pope is the Antichrist; the Lutheran Church–Missouri Synod affirms that "Antichrist" refers to the office, and not to the person, while the Wisconsin Evangelical Lutheran Synod states that the reference is to the office, but not to the exclusion of the current office holder:

See also 

Evangelical Lutheran Free Church (UAC)

 Lutheran Confessional Synod
Lutheran Orthodoxy

References

External links
The Book of Concord, a collection of Lutheran confessions, 1580
This We Believe, a confession of faith by Wisconsin Evangelical Lutheran Synod
The Eternal Word:  A Lutheran Confession for the Twenty-First Century (Confessional Evangelical Lutheran Conference):
Article I: Holy Scripture
Article II: Justification
Article III: The Holy Spirit
Article IV: The Person and Work of Christ
Article V: Eschatology - Doctrine of the Last Things
Article VI: The Church's Mission

Lutheran theology
Christian theological movements